Legacy or legacies may refer to:

Arts, media and entertainment

Comics
 "Batman: Legacy", a 1996 Batman storyline
 DC Universe: Legacies, a comic book series from DC Comics written by Len Wein
 Legacy, a 1999 quarterly series from Antarctic Press
 Legacy, a 2003–2005 series released by Dabel Brothers Productions
 Legacy, an alternate name for the DC supervillain Wizard who leads the Injustice Society IV team
 Legacy (Marvel Comics), an alias used by Genis-Vell, better known as Captain Marvel
 Legacy Virus, a fictional virus from the Marvel Universe
 Marvel Legacy, a comic book line introduced in 2017
 Star Wars: Legacy, a 2006 series from Dark Horse
 X-Men: Legacy, a 1991 series from Marvel Comics

Film
 Legacy, a 1975 American film starring Joan Hotchkis
 The Legacy (1978 film), a British-American horror film starring Katharine Ross, Sam Elliott, and Roger Daltrey
 Legacy (1998 film), an American film starring David Hasselhoff and Donita Rose
 Legacy (2000 film), an American documentary film
 Legacy (2008 film), alternate title for the American film Pretty Little Devils
 Legacy (2010 film), a British-Nigerian film starring Idris Elba
 Legacy (2013 film), a British television film on BBC Two, based on the Alan Judd novel
 Legacy: A Mormon Journey, a 1990 film produced by The Church of Jesus Christ of Latter-day Saints
 Legacy Releasing, a film distributor of the 1990s based in California
 Tron: Legacy, a 2010 sequel to Tron, a film by Disney

Games
 Legacy, a constructed format in Magic: The Gathering
 Legacy (role-playing game), a tabletop role-playing game
 Legacy of Kain, a series of dark fantasy action-adventure video games
 Star Trek: Legacy, a 2006 computer game by Mad Doc Software and Bethesda Softworks

Literature
 Legacies (novel), a 1998 Repairman Jack novel by F. Paul Wilson
 Legacy (Michener novel), a 1987 historical-fiction novel by James A. Michener
Legacy (Russell novel), a 1994 Doctor Who spin-off novel by Gary Russell
 Legacy, a 1995 science-fiction novel in Greg Bear's The Way series
Legacy, a 1995 science-fiction novel by Steve White
 Legacy (Judd novel), a 2001 spy novel by Alan Judd
 Legacy (Bujold novel), a 2007 fantasy novel in Lois McMaster Bujold's The Sharing Knife series
 Legacy (novel series), a series of novels by Cayla Kluver; also the first book of the series
 Legacy (novella), a 2017 novella and coloring book by Chuck Palahniuk
 Legacy: A Journal of American Women Writers, a scholarly journal

Music
 Legacy Recordings, Sony BMG Music Entertainment's catalog division

Albums
 Legacy (Akir album), 2006
 Legacy (Doc Watson album), 2002
 Legacy (Girlschool album), 2008
 Legacy (Jimmy D. Lane album), 2000
 Legacy (Lenny Breau album), 1983
 Legacy (Madball album), 2005
 Legacy (Myrath album), 2016
 Legacy, a 2010 album by Peter Rowan Bluegrass Band
 Legacy (Poco album), 1989
 Legacy (Ronnie Mathews album), 1979
 Legacy (Shadow Gallery album), 2001
 Legacy (The Flyin' Ryan Brothers album), 2002
 Legacy (The Temptations album), 2004
 Legacy (Upper Hutt Posse album), 2005
 Legacy: De Líder a Leyenda Tour (Yandel EP), 2014
 Legacy: De Líder a Leyenda Tour (Yandel album), 2015
 Legacy... Hymns and Faith, a 2002 album by Christian singer-songwriter Amy Grant
 Legacy, a 2017 live album by the Christian band Planetshakers

Bands
 Dire Straits Legacy, a revival of the band Dire Straits
 Legacy (soul group), a former American band, formed in 1979
 Legacy, a former name for Testament
 Legacy, a band founded by Mårten Andersson

Compilations
 Legacy: A Collection of New Folk Music, a 1989 compilation from Windham Hill Records
 Legacy: The Absolute Best, a two-disc compilation album by The Doors released in 2003
 Legacy: The Best of Mansun, a compilation album released in 2006
 Legacy: The Greatest Hits Collection, a compilation album by Boyz II Men released in 2001

Performers
 L.E.G.A.C.Y., rapper and member of the Justus League
 Legacy (rapper) (born 1991), American rapper and producer, member of New Boyz

Songs
 "Legacy" (Mansun song), 1998
 "Legacy" (Nicky Romero and Krewella song), 2013
 "Legacy" (Eminem song), 2013
 "Legacy", a song by Kutless from Hearts of the Innocent
 "Legacy", a song by Jay Z from 4:44
 "Legacy", a song by Memphis May Fire from Challenger
 "Legacy", a song by Motionless in White from Disguise
 "Legacy", a song by Papa Roach from Infest
 "Legacy", a song by Phinehas from Thegodmachine
 "Legacy", a song by Your Memorial from Redirect

Television
 "Legacies" (Arrow), a 2012 episode of Arrow
 "Legacy" (Arrow), a 2016 episode of Arrow
 "Legacies" (Babylon 5), a 1994 episode from the first season of the science fiction television series Babylon 5
 "Legacy" (Person of Interest), a 2012 episode of Person of Interest
 "Legacy" (Stargate SG-1), a third-season episode of the TV series Stargate SG-1
 "Legacy" (Star Trek: The Next Generation), a 1990 fourth-season episode of Star Trek: The Next Generation
 Legacy (American TV series), a dramatic television series which aired on UPN from 1998 to 1999
 Legacy (Philippine TV series), a 2012 dramatic television series
 The Legacy (TV series), a 2014 Danish dramatic television series
 Poltergeist: The Legacy, a Canadian/American horror television series which ran from 1996 to 1999
 "Legacy" (Law & Order: Criminal Intent), a seventh-season episode from 2008
 "Legacies" (Dallas), a 2013 episode from the revival series Dallas
 "Legacy" (The Flash), a 2018 episode of The Flash
 Legacies (TV series), a 2018 American television series and spinoff of The Originals
 Legacy (South African TV series), a 2020 South African television series

Organizations
 Legacy Australia, a charitable institution
 Legacy Games, an interactive media company
 Legacy of Parks, an American conservation program in the 1970s
 Legacy Village, an outdoor shopping complex in Lyndhurst, Ohio

Places
Legacy, Calgary, a residential neighbourhood in Alberta, Canada
Legacy at Millennium Park, a skyscraper in Chicago, Illinois, US

Sports
 San Francisco Legacy, the last original franchise of the National Women's Basketball League
 Virginia Legacy, a soccer team in the US
 Legacy Trust UK, a consortium associated with the London 2012 Olympic and Paralympic Games
 The Legacy (professional wrestling), a team consisting of WWE Superstars Randy Orton, Ted DiBiase and Cody Rhodes

Technology
 Legacy system, an outdated computer system
 Fedora Legacy, an open-source project
 Legacy Family Tree, genealogy software
 Legacy.com, an online aggregator of obituaries and memorials

Transportation

Air
 ABS Aerolight Legacy, a French powered parachute design
 Legacy, a range of business jets:
 Embraer Legacy 500 and Embraer Legacy 450
 Embraer Legacy 600 and Embraer Legacy 650
 Lancair Legacy, an American light aircraft design
 Legacy carrier, an older airline

Land
 Legacy Parkway, a freeway in Utah, US
 Legacy railway station, a closed railway station near Ruabon, Wales
 Legacy Way, a tunnel in Brisbane, Australia
 Subaru Legacy, a mid-size car

Other uses
 Legacy INS, another name for the US Immigration and Naturalization Service
 Legacy preferences, favorable consideration of an applicant for a school, college, or university that was attended by the applicant's relative
 Inheritance

See also
 The Legacy (disambiguation)
 Legacy of Blood (disambiguation)
 Legacy of Darkness (disambiguation)